Alekos Alekou (born 13 December 1983 in Limassol, Cyprus) is a Cypriot football striker who plays for FK Poprad.

Alekou has previously played for several teams in the Cypriot First Division and for Iraklis FC in the Greek Superleague. Alekou made his debut for the Cyprus national team in 2005 against Wales.

On 10 May 2016, he joined Finnish KTP. After having played only five matches for KTP due to injuries, Alekou mutually agreed with his club on 28 July 2016 to terminate his contract.

References

External links
 
 "Signs for KTP"

Video links
 Watch Alekos Alekou goals in FC Jazz.

1983 births
Living people
Sportspeople from Limassol
Cypriot footballers
Aris Limassol FC players
Ethnikos Achna FC players
Iraklis Thessaloniki F.C. players
APOP Kinyras FC players
AEK Larnaca FC players
Nea Salamis Famagusta FC players
Soproni VSE players
FC Jazz players
FK Poprad players
2. Liga (Slovakia) players
Association football forwards
Cyprus international footballers
Cypriot expatriate footballers
Cypriot expatriate sportspeople in Greece
Cypriot expatriate sportspeople in Hungary
Cypriot expatriate sportspeople in Finland
Cypriot expatriate sportspeople in Slovakia
Expatriate footballers in Greece
Expatriate footballers in Hungary
Expatriate footballers in Finland
Expatriate footballers in Slovakia
Kotkan Työväen Palloilijat players